Asmik may be:
 the short name of Asmik Ace, a Japanese entertainment company
 a spelling variant of the Armenian given name Hasmik; notable people with the name include:
 Asmik Grigorian (born 1981), Armenian-Lithuanian opera singer
 Asmik Shiroyan (born 1993),  Armenian-Ukrainian singer and songwriter
 the name of a crater of Venus

See also 
 Asmic